In the Middle of the City (Georgian: შუა ქალაქში) is a Georgian sitcom about a group of friends as they live in Tbilisi's neighborhood  of Vake. The show is produced by The Night Show Studio. It was originally broadcast from 2007 to 2009. The show premiered on September 23, 2007 and completed its first season on July 13, 2007. Second season has been confirmed by Imedi TV. It is filmed in Tbilisi, Georgia. The plot follows the life of one peculiar family, with friends, in Tbilisi, each of which has a risible, odd life-style with many surprises. As for the frivolous family, with singular friends and neighbouring gossip girls, they lead a normal life. It also has a continuation of 10 Years Later.

DVDs
 1. Season 1 - Gasachiri Tbilisshi (Troubles in Tbilsi) (with volumes)
 2. Season 2 - Gagrdzeleba (Sequelance) (with volumes)
 3. Season 3 - Sauketeso Droebi (Best Times) (with volumes)
 4. Season 2 - Rats Etershi Ver Mokhvda (What to TV not seen) (all volumes together)
 5. Season 4 - Komediebi Uakhles Sezonshi (Comedy in the Newest Season) (with volumes)
 6. Season 3 - Gadagheba Shua Kalakis (In the Middle of City Snaping) (together volumes)
 7. The Complete Season 1 (fanmade DVD) (together volumes)
 8. Season 5 - Sicilis Adgili (The Place of the Fun) (DVD release become faster than aired on TV) (with volumes)
 9. Season 6 - (TRED - Fanmade DVD) (all volumes together)
 10. In the Middle of City 10 Episodes (Fanmade) (no volumes)
 11. Season 6 - Sakhlshi Ar Mogtskindeba (House every time good) (Original Version) (with volumes)
 12. Season 7 - Mtliani Komedia (Full Comedy) (with volumes)
 13. Season 8 (unreleased)

Cast
Main Cast In Order of Appearance
 Otar Tatishvili .... Irakli Chkheidze - Marika's husband
 Maia Doborjginidze .... Marika Chkheidze - Irakli's wife
 Goga Barbakadze .... Dato Aleksidze - Marika's cousin
 Tatuli Edisherashvili .... Tamar Glonti - sister of Ketevan, Chkheidze's neighbour
 Tamuna Nikoladze .... Ketevan Glonti - sister of Tamar, Chkheidze's neighbour
 Bacho Kajaia .... Lasha Toronjadze - husband of Ketevan, Chkheidze's neighbour
 Keta Lortkipanidze .... Eka - friend of Chkheidze's 
 Jaba Kiladze .... Sandro Makharadze - Chkheidze's families friend
 Salome Chulukhadze .... Salome - Waitress, Sandro's lover
 Mariam Jologua .... Anano - Dato's Ex-girlfriend
 Lela Meburishvili .... Tika - Chkheidze's neighbour

Episodes Cast
 Nika Katsaridze ... Amiran - "Chkheidze's handicraftsman"
 Gia Mujiri ... Sasha - "Chkheidze's neighbour"
 Sandro Margalitashvili ... Jibo - Dato's friend
 Nino Khomasuridze .... Waitress #1 - In the cafe
 Eka Lobzhanidze .... Waitress #2
 Rezo Bagashvili .... Father #1
 Merab Devidze .... Father #2
 Tamar Skhirtladze .... Grandmother
 Ketevan Gugeshidze .... Irakli's mother
 Nino Koberidze .... Tsisana - Mother in Law
 Maia Tatishvili .... Natela
 Levan Zagashvili
 Nino Zodelava
 Tato Chokhonelidze
 Tiko Sokhadze .... Nini - Dato's friend
 Temur Kiladze .... Solomon
 Goga Chkheidze .... Narrator
 Dato Machavariani .... Gocha
 Sofia Mayer.... Gvantsa Glonti
 Gigi Gogoladze .... Dmitri
 Nika Garsenishvili .... Player
 Vasili Kartvelishvili .... Photographer
 Mariam Kakabadze .... Journalist
 Vano Chelidze
 Zura Manjgaladze
 Irakli Shengelia
 Kakha Mikiashvili .... Rezo
 Nino Gudavadze .... Guide
 Nini Tsiklauri
 Tornike Prangishvili
 Juka Tsiklauri .... Witch
 Bakar Gelashvili .... Japaridze
 Zura Manjgaladze .... Doctor
 Eka Kikvadze .... Nurse Natia
 Tsisia Metreveli .... Irinka
 Eka Jamagidze .... Vika
 Ani Beshitaishvili
 Ani Chumburidze .... 
 Ani Topuridze ....

Crew
Project Manager
 David Gogichaishvili

Executive Producer
 Irakli Kakabadze

Project Director
 Vano Chelidze

Set Director
 Gocha Korkhelauri

Screenplay
 Giorgi Janelidze
 Irakli Vakhtangishvili

Computer Grapichs and Editing
 Vakho Kakauridze
 Merab Devidze
 Giorgi Zenaishvili

Set Operators
 Irakli Gokadze
 Levan Dabrundashvili

Operators
 Merab Kiknadze
 Giorgi Bendiashvili
 Beka Shakashvili

Painter
 Eka Amashukeli

Segment-Producers
 Mariam Mdinaradze
 Nini Kintsurashvili

Coordinador
 Eka Kikvadze

Studio Design
 Vano Chelidze
 Eka Amashukeli

Decorators
 Gela Gelashvili
 Tengo Amiridze

Sound Operator
 Giorgi Saralidze

Lighting
 Irakli Gokadze
 Valiko Machabeli
 Davit Kupatadze

Intro Music
 Giga Mikaberidze

Intro Graphics
 Eka Bichiashvili

Studio Engineers
 Yuri Agekian
 Avto Kajaia
 Gia Merabishvili
 Ramaz Danelia

Visage
 Irina Iamanidze

Operators Assistant
 Giorgi Chigladze

Format Consultants
 Mitch Semuel
 Bill Persky
 John Marcus
 Norm Gunzenhauer
 Bruce Ferber
 Craig Cnaizeg

Episode Dates
Season 1
September:
 09.23.2007----------Episode 01
 09.29.2007----------Episode 02
 09.30.2007----------Episode 03

October:
 10.06.2007----------Episode 04
 10.07.2007----------Episode 05
 10.13.2007----------Episode 06
 10.14.2007----------Episode 07
 10.20.2007----------Episode 08
 10.21.2007----------Episode 09
 10.27.2007----------Episode 10
 10.28.2007----------Episode 11

November:
 11.03.2007----------Episode 12
 11.04.2007----------Episode 13

December:
 12.15.2007----------Episode 14
 12.16.2007----------Episode 15
 12.22.2007----------Episode 16
 12.23.2007----------Episode 17

May:
 05.24.2008----------Episode 18
 05.25.2008----------Episode 19
 05.31.2008----------Episode 20

June:
 06.01.2008----------Episode 21
 06.07.2008----------Episode 22
 06.08.2008----------Episode 23
 06.14.2008----------Episode 24
 06.15.2008----------Episode 25
 06.21.2008----------Episode 26
 06.22.2008----------Episode 27
 06.28.2008----------Episode 28
 06.29.2008----------Episode 29

July:
 07.05.2008----------Episode 30
 07.06.2008----------Episode 31
 07.12.2008----------Episode 32
 07.13.2008----------Episode 33

Season 2
October:
 10.11.2008----------Episode 01
 10.12.2008----------Episode 02
 10.18.2008----------Episode 03
 10.19.2008----------Episode 04
 10.25.2008----------Episode 05
 10.26.2008----------Episode 06

November:
 11.01.2008----------Episode 07
 11.02.2008----------Episode 08
 11.08.2008----------Episode 09
 11.09.2008----------Episode 10
 11.15.2008----------Episode 11
 11.16.2008----------Episode 12
 11.22.2008----------Episode 13
 11.23.2008----------Episode 13
 11.29.2008----------Episode 14
 11.30.2008----------Episode 15

December:
 12.06.2008----------Episode 16
 12.07.2008----------Episode 17
 12.13.2008----------Episode 18
 12.14.2008----------Episode 19
 12.20.2008----------Episode 20
 12.21.2008----------Episode 21
 12.27.2008----------Episode 22
 12.28.2008----------Episode 23
 12.31.2008----------Episode 24

January:
 01.01.2009----------Episode 25

10 Years Later
10 Years Later (Georgian: 10 წლის შემდეგ) is a Georgian television program. Continuation of In the Middle of the City TV Series where the line is drawn between the groups of friends as they live in Tbilisi's district of Vake.

Cast
 Otar Tatishvili - Irakli Chkheidze
 Maia Doborjginidze - Marika Chkheidze
 Goga Barbakadze - Dato Aleksidze
 Tatuli Edisherashvili - Tamar Glonti
 Tamuna Nikoladze - Ketevan Glonti
 Bacho Kajaia - Lasha Toronjadze
 Mariam Jologua - Anano

References

Television shows set in Georgia (country)
Television sitcoms in Georgia (country)
2000s Georgia (country) television series
2010s Georgia (country) television series
Imedi TV original programming